The Massif de l'Esterel (Occitan Provençal: Esterèu; English: Esterel Massif) is a Mediterranean coastal mountain range in the departments of Var and Alpes-Maritimes on the French Riviera. Neighbouring cities are Mandelieu-la-Napoule and Cannes on the east, as well as Saint-Raphaël and Fréjus on the west.

The soil and rocks of the range are of volcanic origin, composed mainly of rhyolite,  which gives the hills a red color. The terrain is rugged, with deep ravines and oak forests. The highest point of the massif is Mont Vinaigre (618 metres or 2,028 feet).

The massif covers an area of 320 km² (123.5 sqmi), of which 130 km² (50.1 sqmi) are protected by the Forêt domaniale de l'Esterel (national forest). The nature reserve offers hiking and mountain biking trails including the GR 49 and GR 51. The Esterel mountains also host the Pierre & Vacances holiday village Cap Esterel. The Corniche d'Or, a touristic road along the coast and Île d'Or, links Saint-Raphaël and Cannes.

Gallery

References

External links

 Esterel massif: Picture Gallery

Landforms of Var (department)
Mountains of Alpes-Maritimes
Mountain ranges of Provence-Alpes-Côte d'Azur
Volcanism of France